Cheyenne Erin Knight (born January 22, 1997) is an American professional golfer. She played collegiate golf at the University of Alabama where she was a three-time all-American and the 2017 SEC Player of the Year and a member of the Psi chapter of Alpha Gamma Delta. On October 6, 2019, Knight won the Volunteers of America Classic on the LPGA Tour.

Amateur wins
2012 KPMG Stacy Lewis Junior Girls Open
2013 U.S. Air Force Academy Girls
2014 Genesis Shootout
2016 Darius Rucker Intercollegiate, Mason Rudolph Championship
2017 Darius Rucker Intercollegiate
2018 Liz Murphy Collegiate Classic

Source:

Professional wins (1)

LPGA Tour wins (1)

Results in LPGA majors
Results not in chronological order in 2020.

CUT = missed the half-way cut
WD = withdrew
NT = no tournament
T = tied

Summary

LPGA Tour career summary

^ official as of July 18, 2022  
*Includes matchplay and other tournaments without a cut.

References

External links

American female golfers
Alabama Crimson Tide women's golfers
LPGA Tour golfers
Golfers from Texas
People from Aledo, Texas
1997 births
Living people
20th-century American women
21st-century American women